Thomas Branigan Memorial Library; often referred to as simply "Branigan", is the public library serving Las Cruces, New Mexico.

History 
The library was founded in 1935 and a library building constructed at 106 W. Hadley (now 501 N. Main Street) as the result of a bequest from Mrs. Alice Branigan in memory of her husband Capt. Thomas Branigan.
Its immediate predecessor was the Woman's Improvement Association library founded in 1924; this library was disbanded in 1935 when the Branigan library opened and its collection became the core of the Branigan collection.

The current  library building at 200 E. Picacho Avenue was constructed in 1979 
on the site of the former Lucero School (1942–1963).
The architects were Dean and Hunt Associates Ltd of Albuquerque. The building was dedicated December 9, 1979 The 1935 library building is now the Branigan Cultural Center and is on the National Register of Historic Places.

The 1979 library was constructed in two floors, with the collection on the first floor and offices and work areas on the second floor. Beginning in 2008 part of the collection was moved to the second floor.
The library is running out of space and is looking at plans for expansion and the opening of branch libraries.
In July 2003 the library opened a satellite library in the Robert Munson Senior Center.

Carol A. Brey-Casiano, the Library Director from 1996 to 2000, was president of the American Library Association for 2004–2005.

Services 
Library cards are free to residents of Doña Ana County. Card holders can check out books, audio books, compact discs, videos, art prints, and magazines.

Summer Reading Programs have been running since 1972 and attract about 600 to 800 children each year. A homebound delivery program began in 1973. Two bookmobiles were purchased in 1975 and service continued until 2008 when they were replaced by a books-by-mail program.

Regular art exhibits are held in the Terrace Gallery on the library's second floor.

The library's weekly news column, "Branigan Book Notes", appears on Sundays in Las Cruces Sun-News, and a monthly column, "Greater Words & Things", appears monthly in The Ink, a free tabloid covering the arts.

See also

National Register of Historic Places listings in Doña Ana County, New Mexico

References

External links

National Register Digital Assets, National Park Service

Public libraries in New Mexico
Buildings and structures in Las Cruces, New Mexico
Buildings and structures in Doña Ana County, New Mexico
Library buildings completed in 1979
Libraries on the National Register of Historic Places in New Mexico
National Register of Historic Places in Doña Ana County, New Mexico
Pueblo Revival architecture in New Mexico